Theodor August Konrad Loos (18 May 1883 – 27 June 1954) was a German actor.

The son of a watchmaker and instruments manufacturer, he left secondary school prematurely and worked for three years at an export firm for music instruments in Leipzig, and after that for his uncle, an art dealer in Berlin. He decided though to become an actor.

His theater engagements led him to Leipzig, Danzig and Frankfurt am Main, then to Berlin where he acted from 1912 to 1945 at different theaters. In the 1930s he could be seen performing in classic theater, on over 400 occasions in Peer Gynt alone.

From 1913 he performed in more than 170 feature films, initially silent films. He remains perhaps best-known for his numerous roles in the films of Fritz Lang. During the Third Reich Loos was a member of the Advisory Council (Präsidialrat) of the president of the Reichsfilmkammer.

After the end of the war, Loos returned to the theater. From August 1949 he was a member of the Staatstheater Stuttgart. His two sons both died in the Second World War.

Selected filmography 

 Das goldene Bett (1913)
 Die Eisbraut (1913)
 Im Schützengraben (1913)
 Das Hochstapler-Trio (1914)
 Das Haus ohne Tür (1914)
 Thora West (1915)
 Maria Niemand und ihre zwölf Väter (1915)
 Doch die Liebe fand einen Weg (1915)
 Der geheimnisvolle Wanderer (1915)
 Frau Eva (1916)
 Abseits vom Glück (1916) – Tonio
 Homunculus (1916–1917, part 1–5) – Sven Friedland
 Friedrich Werders Sendung (1916) – Father / Son
 Die Richterin von Solvigsholm (1916)
 Die grüne Phiole (1916)
 Das Wunder der Madonna (1916) – Bildhauer
 Das Haus der Leidenschaften (1916)
 Das letzte Spiel (1917) – Prince / Actor
 Christa Hartungen (1917) – Reginald Dickens
 Die Sündenkette (1917)
 Das Gewissen des Andern (1917)
 Das Buch des Lasters (1917) – Horst von Franken
 Frau Eva (1917)
 ...und führe uns nicht in Versuchung (1917) – Laienbruder Franziskus
 Die schwarze Loo (1917)
 Der geigende Tod (1917) – Jord
 Das Licht in der Nacht (1917) – Percy Wiggins 
 Let There Be Light (1917)
 Robin Morris (1918) – Robin Morris
 Es werde Licht! (1918, part 2, 3) – Professor Wolfgang Sandow/ Hans
 Precious Stones (1918, Short) – Pieter Swandam
 Die Singende Hand (1918) – Leonid Heller
 Der Letzte Gang (1919) – Bildhauer Hell
 Treu der Jugend (1919) – Paul Günther
 Stiefkinder des Glücks (1919) – Hans von Holm
 Spiele eines Milliardärs (1919)
 Nach dem Gesetz (1919) – Albert Holm,Artzt
 Die Toten kehren wieder – Enoch Arden (1919) – Enoch Arden
 Die Launen eines Milliardärs (1919)
 Das Lied der Nornen (1919) – Eldar Asselder
 Figures of the Night (1920)
 Die Nacht der Prüfung (1920)
 The Merry-Go-Round (1920) – Fritz Peters
 Die Frau ohne Dienstag (1920) – Poet
 Der Menschheit Anwalt (1920) – Mönch – Novice Severin
 Kurfürstendamm (1920) – Raoul Hasenzwing
 Christian Wahnschaffe (1920–1921, part 1, 2) – Amadeus Voß
 Helmsman Holk (1920) – Jacon Siebensee
 Sehnende Liebe (1920)
 Im Banne der Suggestion (1920)
 Die Spielerin (1920)
 Die Geheimnisse von New York (1920)
 Das Wüstengrab (1920)
 Dämmernde Nächte (1920) – Sverre
 Die Geschwister Barelli (1921)
 The House in Dragon Street (1921) – Funke, Lias Bräutigam
 Der zeugende Tod (1921) – Sylvester Sender, Maler
 The Solemn Oath (1921) – Count Horst
 Betrogene Betrüger (1921)
 Die kleine Dagmar (1921) – Maler Hennecke
 Treasure of the Aztecs (1921)
 Lady Hamilton (1921) – George Romney
 Die Schuldige (1921) – Pastor Behrens
 Der rätselhafte Tod (1921)
 Schuld und Sühne (1922)
 Othello (1922) – Cassio
 Hannele's Journey to Heaven (1922) – Lehrer Gottwald
 Youth (1922) – Kapellan Schigorski
 Macht der Versuchung (1922)
 It Illuminates, My Dear (1922) – Count Biron
 Der Kampf ums Ich (1922)
 Das blinde Glück (1922)
 Friedrich Schiller (1923) – Friedrich Schiller
 The Vice of Gambling (1923)
 Das Kabinett des Dr. Segato (1923)
 Die Nibelungen (1924) – King Gunther
 Debit and Credit (1924) – Freiherr von Rothensattel
 Claire (1924)
 Aufstieg der kleinen Lilian (1925)
 What the Stones Tell (1925)
 Our Heavenly Bodies (1925)
 Goetz von Berlichingen of the Iron Hand (1925) – Franz von Sickingen
 Manon Lescaut (1926) – Tiberge
 Women of Passion (1926) – Mr. von Golitzki
 The Violet Eater (1926) – Officer Eckhoff
 Sword and Shield (1926) – Mr. von Golitzki
 Das Lebenslied (1926)
 Metropolis (1927) – Josaphat / Joseph
 Liebeshandel (1927)
 The Impostor (1927) – Prof. Gehrsdorf
 Prinz Louis Ferdinand (1927) – Ernst Moritz Arndt
 Lord of the Night (1927) – Dr. Lanz
 The Weavers (1927) – Bäcker
 Queen Louise (1927–1928, part 1, 2) – Count Hardenberg
 Bigamie (1927) – Lawyer
 Petronella (1927) – Pfarrer Imboden
 Luther (1928) – Melanchthon
 Spies (1928) – Handelsminister (uncredited)
 Sensations-Prozess (1928)
 The Schorrsiegel Affair (1928) – Mr. van der Wal
 Cry for Help (1928)
 Homecoming (1928)
 Anastasia, the False Czar's Daughter (1928) – Grand Duke Michael
 Diana (1929)
 The Night of Terror (1929) – Jegorow
 § 173 St.G.B. Blutschande (1929) – Pastor
 Atlantik (1929) – Pastor Wagner
 Napoleon at Saint Helena (1929) – Capt. Pionkowski
 Ludwig II, King of Bavaria (1929) – Dr. von Gudden
 The Great Longing (1930) – Regisseur Hall
 Boycott (1930) – Dr.Hermann
 The Flute Concert of Sanssouci (1930) – Menzel
 Two People (1930) – Prior
 1914 (1931) – Paléologue
 Ariane (1931) – Dr. Hans Adameit
 The Case of Colonel Redl (1931) – General Alfred Redl
 I Go Out and You Stay Here (1931) – Konstantin von Haller
 Vertauschte Gesichter (1931) – Peter van Diemen
 M (1931) – Inspector Groeber
 In the Employ of the Secret Service (1931) – Dubbin
 The Other Side (1931) – Lieutenant Osborne
 Yorck (1931) – Roder
 Holzapfel Knows Everything (1932) – Konsul van Doeren
 Under False Flag (1932) – Rakowski
 Rasputin, Demon with Women (1932) – Pope
 A Shot at Dawn (1932) – Bachmann
 The Eleven Schill Officers (1932) – Officer Hans Küffer
 Eight Girls in a Boat (1932) – Baumeister Engelhardt
 The Heath Is Green (1932) – Lüder Lüdersen
 Death Over Shanghai (1932) – James Biggers
 Trenck (1932) – Frederick II 
 Marshal Forwards (1932) – King Friedrich Wilhelm III of Prussia
 Secret of the Blue Room (1932) – Robert von Hellberg
 Sacred Waters (1932) – Landowner
 The Invisible Front (1933) – Henrik Thomsen
 Was wissen denn Männer (1933)
 Die blonde Christl (1933) – Benekdikt Oberbucher
 Spies at Work (1933) – Davila
 The Peak Scaler (1933) – Man in the hotel
 The Testament of Dr. Mabuse (1933) – Dr. Kramm
 Ways to a Good Marriage (1933) – Dr. von Bergen
 A Certain Mr. Gran (1933)
 The Judas of Tyrol (1933) – Commissioner
 Höllentempo (1933) – Mr. von Dermor
 William Tell (1934) – Werner Stauffacher
 Elisabeth and the Fool (1934) – Thomas
 The Girlfriend of a Big Man (1934) – Dr. Nordegg
 A Woman With Power of Attorney (1934) – Holsten
 Hanneles Himmelfahrt (1934) – Lehrer Gottwald
 The Sporck Battalion (1934) – Oberförster Rüdiger
 The Old and the Young King (1935) – Von Rochow
 Joan of Arc (1935) – Dunois
 Stradivari (1935) – Lazarettkommandant
The Green Domino (1935) – Mr. von Falck
 The Girl from the Marsh Croft (1935) – Richter
 Victoria (1935) – Chambellan
 The Student of Prague (1935) – Dr. Carpis
 Henker, Frauen und Soldaten (1935)
 The Higher Command (1935) – Meneckes Mitarbeiter
 The Paris Adventure (1936) – Sir Henry Vinston
 Schlußakkord (1936) – Professor Obereit
 The Hour of Temptation (1936) – Professor Rüdiger
 The Traitor (1936) – Dr. Auer
 White Slaves (1937) – Governor
 The Ruler (1937) – Pastor Immoos
 The Glass Ball (1937) – Dr. Sylten
 The Mystery of Betty Bonn (1938) – Prosecutor Trevor
 Monika (1938) – Professor Waldeck
 The Muzzle (1938) – Prosecutor General
 Comrades at Sea (1938) – Admiral Brackhusen
 Secret Code LB 17 (1938) – Police Prefect
 Shadows Over St. Pauli (1938) – John Carstens
 Parkstrasse 13 (1939) – Dr. Elken
 Robert Koch (1939) –  Dr. Georg Gaffky
 Roman eines Arztes (1939) – Steffen 
 Jud Süß (1940) – Franz Joseph Freiherr von Remchingen
 Counterfeiters (1940) – Professor Bassi
 Kora Terry (1940)
 Alarm (1941) – Rentner Ophagen
 Heimaterde (1941)
 The Thing About Styx (1942) – Lenski
 Rembrandt (1942) – Jan Six
 Andreas Schlüter (1942) – Frederick III.
 Die Entlassung (1942) – Kaiser Wilhelm I.
 Titanic (1943) – Privy Councillor Bergmann (uncredited)
 Reise in die Vergangenheit (1943) –   Dr. Fritz Elmers
 Gabriele Dambrone (1943) – Dr. Christopher
 Philharmoniker (1944) – Herbert Hartwig
 Shiva und die Galgenblume (1945) – Commissioner Pattberg
 Der Fall Molander (1945)
 The Millionaire (1947) – Schreyegg
 The Murder Trial of Doctor Jordan (1949)
 Stars Over Colombo (1953) – Religious
 The Prisoner of the Maharaja (1954) – Religious
 Roses from the South (1954) – Minister
 Die blonde Frau des Maharadscha (1962) – Religious (final film role)

References

External links

Photographs and literature

1883 births
1954 deaths
German male film actors
German male silent film actors
Commanders Crosses of the Order of Merit of the Federal Republic of Germany
20th-century German male actors